Gustavo Gorriarán (born 10 June 1970) is a Uruguayan swimmer. He competed in two events at the 1992 Summer Olympics.

References

1970 births
Living people
Uruguayan male swimmers
Olympic swimmers of Uruguay
Swimmers at the 1992 Summer Olympics
Place of birth missing (living people)